The Massie Wireless Station (PJ) was built in Point Judith, Rhode Island, in 1907 and may be the oldest surviving working wireless station in the world. It is named for inventor Walter W. Massie, president of the Massie Wireless Telegraph Company. The structure was moved to the New England Wireless and Steam Museum in 1983 where it is preserved as a technology museum and historic site.

History 

In December 1902 the American De Forest Wireless Telegraph Company setup an earlier station in an existing house on a beach near Point Judith Light and another near Block Island Southeast Light,  from the coast. By May 1903 they had successfully exchanged test messages. Messages were sent using Morse code. The stations were initially operated for the Providence Journal to send news stories to the island to be printed locally. Another goal was that passing ships could also send messages to the mainland which would then be relayed to Providence or New York City by telephone arriving hours before the ships reached port. At this time few places in the world were passed by so many ships as Block Island. The Block Island Wireless began publishing in July. At the time it was one of only two daily newspapers that printed dispatches sent by wireless. The stations soon began sending messages (called "aerograms") for the public and charging a fee for the service. Initially, this experimental wireless service was only intermittently successful and the Block Island Wireless ceased publication at the end of August.

The Journal, dissatisfied with the operation, offered management of the two stations to the recently formed Massie company. By 1904 the new equipment installed by Massie to replace the de Forest system enabled reliable two-way communication between the island and the mainland. The stations also provided communications to passenger steamships, particularly those of the Fall River Line. When Massie equipped the steamship Plymouth with wireless it was the first Long Island Sound steamer to have this capability. A Massie employee was stationed on the ship as the wireless operator. The crews on these ships considered Point Judith to be a dangerous point on this route. The shore station would advise them of adverse weather conditions such as fog hours before they reached it. The station would then aide in navigation as it passed.

In 1907 Massie upgraded the Point Judith station by constructing a new building, the one that is preserved today, on the same site.

The steamships Santurce and Ligonaire collided off the coast of Cape Cod due to a thick fog in May 1910. The distress call CQD was received by the Point Judith station which then dispatched a wrecking tug to assist the ships. Wireless operators at the station kept a vigil in April 1912 listening for news from rescue vessels about the sinking of the RMS Titanic. 

Ownership of Massie's stations were then transferred to Marconi's Wireless Telegraph Company in August 1912. The sale included all shore and ship stations along with the contracts that the business held. Massie retained the rights to his patents and continued to maintain a shop with his laboratory equipment. The Point Judith station ceased operation shortly after that.

In 1917 a "radiophone fog warning device" was installed in the lighthouse adjacent to the shutdown Massie station. After three repetitions of this it would then transmit "you are getting closer; keep off" at lower power with a reception range of only  miles.

The building then became a Western Union landline telegraph station until World War II. In subsequent decades it was used as a summer house.

Other stations 
The two original stations were joined by others to form a system along the southern coast of New England. Massie operated other stations farther south along the east coast. The Point Judith station identified using the call letters "PJ". Other stations (and their call letters) that were part of the Massie system included:

Preservation 

In 1983 the building was moved to the New England Wireless and Steam Museum in East Greenwich, Rhode Island, to avoid demolition. The former site is now part of Roger Wheeler State Beach. The station is now situated within the Tillinghast Road Historic District, of which it is listed as a non-contributing building.

Another building at the Museum contains a collection of historic telegraph, radio, and television equipment. The original equipment from the station was donated to the Museum by Massie's family. The transmitter is functional and now operates at  though it is not connected to an antenna. The station was added to the National Register of Historic Places in 2001. The Massie Wireless Club began amateur radio operation from the station in 2018 using the club call sign N1EPJ.

See also 
 Archie Frederick Collins – Massie's company merged with Collin's company in 1909, though the arrangement soon ended.

Notelist

References

Further reading

External links 

 

Infrastructure completed in 1907
Industrial buildings and structures on the National Register of Historic Places in Rhode Island
Buildings and structures in East Greenwich, Rhode Island
National Register of Historic Places in Kent County, Rhode Island
Technology museums in the United States
History of radio
Radio stations disestablished in 1912